State Road 953 (SR 953), locally known as Le Jeune Road (pronounced "Luh-JOO-n"), is a   long north–south street in Miami-Dade County, Florida running a few miles west of central Miami from U.S. Route 1 in Coral Gables to State Road 916 in Opa-locka. It is also known as West 42nd Avenue on the greater Miami grid plan and East 8th Avenue in the Hialeah grid plan.

Route description

SR 953 heads north from US 1 as a four-lane road through residential areas, the eastern end of Coral Gables Senior High School, and the western end of the Village of Merrick Park mall.  SR 953 intersects Bird Road and leaves the campus of Coral Gables High School, entering a pure residential area and remains that way until reaching University Drive.  At that point, the east side of the road becomes commercial and the west side is residential until close to the intersection with Coral Way (State Road 972).  A few blocks north of Coral Way, it resumes with residential housing on the west side of the road and commercial buildings to the east, still in Coral Gables.

At Zamora Avenue, Le Jeune Road divides Coral Gables to the west with unincorporated Miami-Dade County to the east, and enters unincorporated Miami-Dade County just one block north at Mendoza Avenue, becoming purely a residential street again.  At Southwest 8th Street (US 41/Tamiami Trail), Le Jeune Road enters the city of Miami, and becomes a divided road, with two lanes in each direction.

Le Jeune continues north through Miami, remaining a residential street for six blocks before becoming a commercial road.  It continues north through Miami as a commercial street until an interchange with the Dolphin Expressway (SR 836), where the road becomes a divider between the International Links Miami-Melreese golf course to the east and a parking lot to the west.  It reenters unincorporated Miami-Dade County after crossing the Tamiami Canal just south of the entrance to Miami International Airport and its interchange with the southern terminus of the Airport Expressway (SR 112).  Between SR 953's entrance of the airport and the next major interchange north, State Road 948, it creates the eastern boundary of the airport, with airport related business to the east of LeJeune Road.

Just two blocks north of SR 948, SR 953 crosses canal C-6 and crosses US 27 (Okeechobee Road), entering Hialeah as their Southeast 8th Avenue and no longer a divided road.  It continues north as a residential street, crossing State Road 944, becoming East 8th Avenue, the easternmost major street in Hialeah, with some commercial business at East 9th Street, State Road 934, East 41st Street and State Road 932.  North of East 57th Street, it passes by a truck distribution center to the east, and a park to the west. SR 953 then splits off to the Le Jeune/Douglas Road Expressway Connection, providing nearby access to State Road 924, followed by an intersection with East 65th Street at the south end of Amelia Earhart Park, leaving Hialeah and entering Opa-locka where it is again West 42nd Avenue.  North of SR 924, Le Jeune Road is a purely commercial road, servicing truck distribution centers as SR 953 heads towards its northern terminus of State Road 916 (North 135th Street).

North of the airport, Northwest 42nd Avenue continues north to a dead end beyond North 204th Street.

History

According to Joaquin Roy, a highly regarded professor from the University of Miami in his 1989 book "The Streets of Coral Gables"; Le Jeune Road was named after Charles Le Jeune (b. 1878, Belgium) who came to Florida around 1900 and acquired  of coral rock land on which he used dynamite to create tillable soil, and then cultivated orange, grapefruit and lime groves. The road that was the boundary of his property became known as Le Jeune Road.  In 1914, Charles Le Jeune sold his groves to (George) Merrick, developer of Coral Gables, Florida, for $1,700,000. It runs adjacent to the east side and crosses the original entrance/exit to Miami International Airport.

At one point during the 1960s, the entire route was to be upgraded to freeway status, but the plans were cancelled.  Several attempts to upgrade LeJeune Road around Miami International Airport have been proposed, with all of them failing.

Prior to 1983, Le Jeune Road was signed as State Road 913 south of North 103rd Street (SR 932); a designation now being applied to the Rickenbacker Causeway approach.

Major intersections

References

External links

SR 953 @ AARoads.com

Roads in Miami
Roads in Miami-Dade County, Florida
Opa-locka, Florida
Coral Gables, Florida
Transportation in Hialeah, Florida
1983 establishments in Florida